Isaac "Isi" Palazón Camacho (born 27 December 1994) is a Spanish professional footballer who plays as a winger for La Liga club Rayo Vallecano.

Career
Palazón was born in Cieza, Murcia, and made his senior debut with CD Cieza at the age of just 15, after spending a short period at Real Madrid's La Fábrica. He subsequently moved to Villarreal CF's youth setup, reaching the C-team before being released in 2013; he then returned to his first club Cieza.

In 2014, Palazón joined Real Murcia and was initially assigned to the reserves in Tercera División. On 18 December of that year, he agreed to a new three-year contract with the club, being definitely promoted to the main squad in Segunda División B the following year.

On 18 August 2017, Palazón moved to fellow third division side SD Ponferradina, after terminating his contract with Murcia. He contributed with eight goals in 40 appearances during the 2018–19 season, as his side returned to Segunda División after a three-year absence.

Palazón made his professional debut on 18 August 2019, starting in a 3–1 away loss against Cádiz CF. He scored his first goal in the category on 26 October, netting his team's second in a 3–1 away defeat of Rayo Vallecano

On 23 January 2020, Palazón signed a three-and-a-half-year contract with fellow second division side Rayo.

Career statistics

Club

References

External links

1994 births
Living people
People from Cieza, Murcia
Spanish footballers
Footballers from the Region of Murcia
Association football wingers
La Liga players
Segunda División players
Segunda División B players
Tercera División players
CD Cieza players
Villarreal CF C players
Real Murcia Imperial players
Real Murcia players
SD Ponferradina players
Rayo Vallecano players